The following is a list of United States cities, towns, and unincorporated areas (Census Designated Places) in which a plurality of the population is African American or Black. 

Essex County, New Jersey
Iberville Parish, Louisiana
Philadelphia County, Pennsylvania
Shelby County, Tennessee
Beaumont, Texas
Bowie, Maryland
Bryn Mawr-Skyway, Washington
Camden, New Jersey
Chicago
Cincinnati
Danville, Virginia
Ecorse, Michigan
Englewood, New Jersey
Fayetteville, North Carolina
Glenn Heights, Texas
Greenbelt, Maryland
Griffin, Georgia
Hempstead (village), New York
Hillside, Illinois
Hyattsville, Maryland
Laurel, Maryland
Marin City, California
Milwaukee
Norfolk, Virginia
Philadelphia
Saginaw, Michigan
Scottsville, Texas
St. Louis
New York City
Memphis
Detroit
Atlanta
Miami
Dallas
Houston

References 

African American
African American-related lists